Fort Abercrombie, in North Dakota, was an American fort established by authority of an act of Congress, March 3, 1857.  The act allocated twenty-five square miles of land on the Red River of the North in Dakota Territory to be used for a military outpost, but the exact location was left to the discretion of Lieutenant Colonel John J. Abercrombie. The fort was constructed in the year 1858. It was the first permanent military settlement in what became North Dakota, and is thus known as "The Gateway to the Dakotas".

History
Because the original location was prone to flooding, a new fort was built at a higher location in 1860, north of the original location. It was besieged by the Dakota (Sioux) Indians for more than six weeks during the Dakota War of 1862.  The fort was abandoned in 1877 and the town of Abercrombie, North Dakota, was founded a half mile west in 1884. Abercrombie Township was settled, in part, due to the early presence of the fort.

The fort served as a transportation hub as it guarded the Red River Trails used by the Red River ox cart trains of the late fur trade, military supply wagon trains, stagecoach routes, and steamboat traffic on the Red River.

The original buildings were either destroyed or sold at public auction when the fort was abandoned, but a Works Progress Administration project in 1939–1940 reconstructed three blockhouses and the stockade (fence) and returned the original military guardhouse to the site.  More recent renovations include dismantling the southeast blockhouse and using salvageable materials to renovate the two remaining blockhouses and the guardhouse.

A new stockade was constructed and native grasses are allowed to grow in the locations of the missing buildings for visitors to get an idea about the size and shape of the buildings.  A visitor's center was built in the summer of 2007. Today it is known as Fort Abercrombie State Historic Site and includes a modern museum and pavilion in the town of Abercrombie. The fort itself is a quarter mile east.

Dakota War of 1862
At the outbreak of the war, Fort Abercrombie was garrisoned by Company D of the 5th Minnesota Infantry Regiment, led by fort commander Captain John Vander Horck. On August 25, 1862, Vander Horck mustered in a company of citizen soldiers, led by Captain T. D. Smith. Another unit was Captain Ambrose Freeman's Company of Mounted Men, the "Northern Rangers," organized in St. Cloud, Minnesota for the relief of Fort Abercrombie on August 24, 1862.

In August 1862 its defenses were tested. When increasing Indian activity by reconnaissance parties, drove nearby settlers into the fort's stockade. The Sioux besieged Fort Abercrombie for almost six weeks, alternating between occasional sniping and all-out attacks on all four sides of the fort. The garrison and settlers with rifles, shotguns, and howitzers held the fort.

During the conflict, the Sioux attacks targeted Fort Abercrombie, Fort Ridgely, New Ulm, and all of the white settlements as far as the Mississippi River. The hostiles were divided into two contingents. The first constituted the lower party, which fought at Fort Ridgely, New Ulm, Redwood Ferry, and Birch Coulee. The upper contingent attacked Fort Abercrombie, along with other northern counties. There are sources that cite a lack of plan of the campaign due to the way the attackers merely wanted to overwhelm and sweep away their targets.

Unlike other settlements, Fort Abercrombie was spared from any major assault, but it was consistently harassed by around 400 Upper Santees, Yanktons, and Yanktonais, who successfully captured several outer buildings. The first of these attacks occurred on September 3, 1862. The siege lasted for six hours without inflicting any serious damage. When the attacks commenced three days later, the Sioux were able to kill and injure several soldiers. During the course of the Dakota War at the Fort Abercrombie, the attackers - who took cover from the woods - were largely repulsed by fired howitzer shells.

Casualties
Killed: 
Sgt Edward Wright (Sept 23, 1862)
Corporal James Bennett (with party sent to Breckinridge)
Ostler Charles W. Soell (Sept 6, 1862)
Private Augustus Ruchenell
Wounded:
Private C. P. Lull (Severely; Sept 23, 1862)
Private Edwin M. Wright (Severely; Sept 3, 1862)

References

Further reading
Barnes, Jeff. Forts of the Northern Plains: Guide to Historic Military Posts of the Plains Indian Wars. Mechanicsburg, PA: Stackpole Books, 2008.

External links
Fort Abercrombie State Historic Site website
Friends of Fort Abercrombie

1860 establishments in the United States
Dakota War of 1862
Abercrombie
Military and war museums in North Dakota
Museums in Richland County, North Dakota
National Register of Historic Places in Richland County, North Dakota
North Dakota State Historic Sites
Pre-statehood history of North Dakota
Works Progress Administration in North Dakota
Conflict sites on the National Register of Historic Places